Wicked Blood is a 2014 action thriller film written and directed by Mark Young and starring Abigail Breslin, Alexa Vega, and Sean Bean. It was released on March 4, 2014, in the United States.

Premise
Hannah Lee Baker (Abigail Breslin) and  Amber Baker (Alexa Vega) live with their uncle Donny Baker (Lew Temple).   Donny is a meth cook for his brother in law and the girl's uncle Frank Stinson (Sean Bean). Hannah puts into play a conspiracy to free   herself, Amber and Donny from Frank's  grasp.

Cast 
 Abigail Breslin as Hannah Lee Baker
 Alexa Vega as Amber Dawn Baker
 Sean Bean as Frank Stinson
 Lew Temple as Donny Baker
 James Purefoy as Bill Owens
 Jake Busey as Bobby Stinson
 J. D. Evermore as Doctor
 Ritchie Montgomery as Hank
 Thomas Francis Murphy as Bearded Man

External links

References 

2014 direct-to-video films
2014 films
2014 action thriller films
Direct-to-video action films
Direct-to-video thriller films
American action thriller films
2010s English-language films
Films directed by Mark Young
2010s American films